Chile competed at the 2004 Summer Paralympics in Athens, Greece. The team included four athletes, all of them men, and won no medals.

Sports

Athletics

Men's track

Table tennis

Wheelchair tennis

See also
Chile at the Paralympics
Chile at the 2004 Summer Olympics

References 

Nations at the 2004 Summer Paralympics
2004
Summer Paralympics
Disability in Chile